Lefteris Matsoukas (born 7 March 1990) is a Greek professional footballer who plays as a forward for Super League 2 club Irodotos.

Club career
Born in Piraeus, Matsoukas played in the youth teams of Olympiacos before being promoted to the first team. He was given his first contract by the club and scored his first goal in a pre-season friendly against Viktoria Plzeň. His first league match came on 29 December 2007 against Xanthi.

Following loans to Egaleo, Ethnikos Asteras and SV Werder Bremen II he permanently moved to Werder Bremen II on a free transfer on 30 June 2010.

On 4 August 2013, he signed a contract with Greek Football League club Iraklis. In July 2014 he signed for Fostiras.

On 11 August 2018, he moved to newly promoted side Aittitos Spata on a free transfer.

International career
Matsoukas was a member of the Greece U19 national team.

References

External links
 
 Myplayer.gr Profile

1990 births
Living people
Footballers from Piraeus
Greek footballers
Association football forwards
3. Liga players
Serbian SuperLiga players
Serbian First League players
Olympiacos F.C. players
Egaleo F.C. players
Ethnikos Asteras F.C. players
SV Werder Bremen II players
Kallithea F.C. players
Iraklis Thessaloniki F.C. players
Fostiras F.C. players
Panegialios F.C. players
PAS Lamia 1964 players
Doxa Drama F.C. players
Aittitos Spata F.C. players
FK Dinamo Vranje players
Ionikos F.C. players
Greek expatriate footballers
Greek expatriate sportspeople in Germany
Expatriate footballers in Germany
Greek expatriate sportspeople in Serbia
Expatriate footballers in Serbia